Steve Vick (born May 23, 1956) is an American politician serving as a member of the Idaho Senate from the 2nd district. He was previously a member of the Montana House of Representatives from 1995 to 2002.

Early life and education 
Born in Great Falls, Montana, Vick attended Power High School in Power, Montana. In 1979, he earned a Bachelor of Science degree in engineering from Montana State University.

Career 
Vick's is a businessman in home construction and the remodeling business. Vick was also an engineer, farmer, and a real estate appraiser. In 1995, Vick's political career began as a member of Montana State House of representatives. Vick served four consecutive terms in the Montana House of Representatives until 2002.

Elections

Objection to Hindu invocation
On March 3, 2015, Vick (along with three other Idaho senators) refused to enter the Senate chamber during the daily invocation because the guest chaplain was Hindu. When originally questioned about his objection, Vick said, "They have a caste system. They worship cows."

Committees 
Vick is a member of:
 Vice-Chairman Resources and Environment
 Local Government and Taxation
 Transportation
 Chairman of the Appropriations Committee, previously

Memberships 
 National Rifle Association (NRA)
 Idaho Farm Bureau
 Toastmasters.

Personal life 
Vick's wife is Cheryl Ann. They have four children.

References

External links 
 Steve Vick at ballotpedia.org
 Steve Vick at votesmart.org

1956 births
Living people
Republican Party Idaho state senators
Politicians from Great Falls, Montana
Montana State University alumni
21st-century American politicians